Latino Rugby League Sevens is a Rugby league sevens tournament held annually in Cabramatta, New South Wales, Australia.  It was first held in 2015.

Clubs and teams
The clubs that competed in the Latino Rugby League Sevens

 Chile
 Colombia
 Ecuador
 El Salvador
 Peru
 Uruguay

Results
Pool A
Chile 34 d El Salvador 20

Chile 20 d Uruguay 4

El Salvador 22 d Uruguay 14

Pool B
Peru 28 d Ecuador 0

Peru 12 d Colombia 4

Ecuador 18 d Colombia 8

GYG Latino Sevens Final
Chile 14 d Peru 10 (Halftime 10-all)

See also

References

Recurring sporting events established in 2015
Rugby league competitions in New South Wales
Rugby league in Sydney
International rugby league competitions hosted by Australia
2015 establishments in Australia